Round table is a form of academic discussion. Participants agree on a specific topic to discuss and debate. Each person is given equal right to participate, as illustrated by the idea of a circular layout referred to in the term round table.

Round-table discussions, together with houses of hospitality and agronomic universities, is one of the key elements of the Catholic Worker Movement, as formulated by Peter Maurin, one of the co-founders of the movement.

Round table discussions are also a common feature of political talk shows.  Talk shows such as Washington Week and Meet the Press have roundtables of reporters or pundits.  Most of these are done around a table in a studio, but occasionally they report in split-screen from remote locations.  Some sports shows, such as ESPN's Around the Horn, employ the round table format. The round table method is still highly used to this day.

See also
Academic conference

References 

Academic terminology